Brad Krevoy is a film producer, entrepreneur, and founder and chairman/CEO of the Motion Picture Corporation of America. Over his 30-year career, Krevoy has been involved in the production and distribution of more than 150 film and television projects, most notably Dumb and Dumber, and Christmas-themed entertainment including the A Christmas Prince trilogy and The Princess Switch.

Early life and education

Krevoy graduated from Beverly Hills High School. He went on to study at Stanford University, graduating in 1978 with a BA in Political Science. He then went on to study at UC Hastings, College of the Law. After graduation, he served as a Legislative Fellow in the California State Legislature and worked as an entertainment attorney at a prominent Los Angeles law firm.

Early career and work with Roger Corman (1983–1986)

Krevoy's major entry into the film industry came from a chance encounter with Roger Corman at a Stanford football game in 1983. Krevoy worked for Corman's Concorde-New Horizon pictures, handling the business affairs; Concorde quickly becoming one of the largest suppliers of VHS tapes, having deals in place with every major distributor in the world.

MPCA (1986–1996)

In 1986, Krevoy and his longtime business partner Steve Stabler co-founded Motion Picture Corporation of America (MPCA) to focus on producing, acquiring, and distributing commercial film and television productions.

During the company's formative years, they produced cult favorites including The Purple People Eater (1988) with Ned Beatty; Back to Back (1989), starring Bill Paxton and Apollonia; and the sex comedy Miracle Beach (1992).

Dumb and Dumber

Krevoy and Stabler released the blockbuster comedy Dumb and Dumber in 1994. The script had been around for nearly seven years and had been rejected by every major studio; MPCA's support let the writers, Bobby and Peter Farrelly, direct their own film and attach Jim Carrey to star.

Dumb and Dumber broke box office comedy records, opening and remaining at number one on the U.S. box office for four straight weeks over the holiday season. The film went on to gross $127 million domestically and $120 million overseas for a worldwide total of $247 million off of a $16 million budget.

Krevoy and MPCA went on to produce more big-budget studio comedies, including Beverly Hills Ninja starring Chris Farley and Jungle 2 Jungle with Tim Allen. They also produced Threesome, starring Lara Flynn Boyle and Stephen Baldwin. The film was one of the most successful independent arthouse films of the year, grossing just under $15 million domestically.

First-look deals

Starting in November 1995, until they were acquired by Metromedia International Group in 1996, Krevoy and MPCA had a first-look producing deal with Paramount Studios. Krevoy and MPCA also signed a first-look deal with Sony Pictures in the late 90s, where they produced more than 10 movies.

Co-president of Orion Pictures (1996–1998)

In 1996, MPCA was purchased by John Kluge's Metromedia International Group. Metromedia had just purchased the independent production company Orion Pictures from chapter 11 bankruptcy. When MPCA was merged into the company, Krevoy and Stabler took over as the Co-President's of Orion Pictures and were given a six-picture deal.

At Orion, Krevoy oversaw the production, acquisition, and distribution of Orion's motion picture and television programming. He produced films for Academy Award-winner Tom Schulman (Dead Poets Society) and released films such as 1997's Academy Award and Golden Globe nominee for Best Foreign Language Film, Prisoner of the Mountains (directed by Sergei Bodrov), and the acclaimed Ulee's Gold (directed by Victor Nunez and presented by Jonathan Demme). Ulee’s Gold was a critical hit and won its leading actor, Peter Fonda, his first and only Golden Globe for best actor. Fonda also received his first and only Oscar nomination for best actor.

After two years of revitalizing Orion Pictures, Metromedia went on to sell Orion to MGM. Krevoy was able to take the MPCA name back as part of his original deal.

Restarting MPCA (1998–2014)

In 1998, Krevoy returned to his independent filmmaking roots and restarted MPCA with a distribution deal through MGM.

Since rebooting MPCA, Krevoy has produced a wide array of motion pictures including: boxing drama Joe and Max (which collected both ESPN and ACE award nominations); the 2002 Sundance premiere Bookies; and Boat Trip for Artisan/Lionsgate.

In 2004 Krevoy produced the drama, A Love Song for Bobby Long, starring John Travolta and Scarlett Johansson. The film was well received by audiences and critics, earning Scarlett Johansson a Golden Globe nomination.

After the credit crunch hit in 2008, Krevoy found new investors and ramped up production. He built a strong international sales team and began assembling an eclectic slate of programming.

Krevoy produced the 2009 war drama Taking Chance, based on the true experiences of Lt. Colonel Michael Strobl, who wrote about his time in the widely circulated article “Taking Chance Home". The film was directed by Ross Katz and starred Kevin Bacon. It was shown at the Sundance Film Festival before premiering on HBO. Taking Chance received a total of 27 award nominations and 6 wins, also winning the Humanitas Prize.

Krevoy and MPCA produced a string of straight-to-DVD action movies. These included Linewatch (2008); Hardwired (2009), which also starred Val Kilmer; Ticking Clock (2011); and One in the Chamber (2012), featuring Dolph Lundgren. They produced two movies with Samuel L. Jackson: Arena (2011); and Meeting Evil (2012). During this time MPCA also made two movies with Jean-Claude Van Damme – Assassination Games (2011); and Six Bullets (2012).

In 2011, Krevoy produced Beverly Hills Chihuahua 2 for Disney, a sequel to the 2008 hit comedy. Most of the original cast returned and the film did well in the home video market with sales of over $30 million.

In 2014, Krevoy and Stabler were executive producers on Dumb and Dumber To, taking place 20 years after the events of the first film. Jeff Daniels and Jim Carrey reprised their roles and the film was released on November 14, 2014. It opened at number one in the U.S. box office, and went on to earn $169 million worldwide.

Christmas and family movies (2013–present)

Since 2013, Krevoy and MPCA have produced more than 40 original Christmas and family movies for select broadcasters, including Netflix and The Hallmark Channel.

With Netflix

Krevoy and MPCA's first production for Netflix, A Christmas Prince, starring Rose McIver, Ben Lamb and Alice Krige, was released on November 17, 2017. In 2018, MPCA produced The Princess Switch, starring Vanessa Hudgens and Sam Palladio.

MPCA’s other recent Netflix holiday movies include Holiday in the Wild, starring Rob Lowe and Kristin Davis; The Knight Before Christmas, starring Vanessa Hudgens and Josh Whitehouse; The Holiday Calendar, starring Kat Graham, Quincy Brown, and Ron Cephas Jones; and Christmas Inheritance, starring Eliza Taylor and Jake Lacy.

With Hallmark

Krevoy and MPCA have produced over 30 original movies for Hallmark and Hallmark Movies & Mysteries, including several film franchises. A few of these include all five entries in the popular Murder, She Baked series based on the book series by Joanne Fluke, all three of the Flower Shop Mystery series of films, based on the book series by Kate Collins, four films in the Darrow & Darrow series from writer Phoef Sutton, and three installments of The Crossword Mysteries, which were produced in collaboration with NY Times Crossword editor Will Shortz.

Krevoy is an executive producer of the Hallmark Channel show When Calls the Heart. The series is adapted from the bestselling Canadian West series of books by Janette Oke. The show has been hugely successful in the ratings, including high numbers for the Christmas specials. The show is currently airing its seventh season, making it the longest-running original series on Hallmark. In August 2019, a spin-off show titled When Hope Calls launched with Hallmark’s new streaming service, Hallmark Movies Now.

With GAC Family 
In 2021, Krevoy began a partnership with the newly rebranded network GAC Family, run by former Hallmark Channel CEO Bill Abbott. MPCA producing twelve Christmas films for their first holiday season, starring Cameron Mathison, Maggie Lawson, Chad Michael Murray, Jill Wagner, Jen Lilley, and Becca Tobin. When Hope Calls also premiered a second season, moving over from Hallmark, and bringing with it When Calls the Heart veteran Lori Loughlin.

2022 saw the release of two romantic comedies for GAC Family, The Winter Palace starring Danica McKellar, and Harmony from the Heart, starring Jessica Lowndes and Jesse Metcalfe. Harmony from the Heart was also produced and written by Lowndes.

Other Holiday Films 
Krevoy and MPCA also began producing Christmas films for CBS and Peacock in 2021. For CBS, they made A Christmas Proposal, starring Adam Rodriguez and Jessica Camacho, as well as Christmas Takes Flight, starring Katie Lowes and Evan Williams. And Peacock got into the Christmas game with The Housewives of the North Pole, starring Real Housewives alum Kyle Richards and Betsy Brandt.

Other ventures

In 1999 Krevoy teamed with exhibition veterans Ron Leslie (Former president of AMC theatres) and Peter Fornstam, as well as real estate attorney Richard Lawrence, to form Resort Theatres of America. By March 1999, the company had acquired all of Metropolitan Theatre Corp.’s Palm screen locations for a total of 85 screens.

In 1999, they purchased and renovated the historic Isis Theatre in Aspen, Co.

Personal life

Brad married his wife Susie in 1996. They live in Santa Monica with their three daughters and two dogs.

Filmography

Film

As a producer

As a production manager

As an actor

Television

As a producer

As a production manager

Miscellaneous crew

 Dumb and Dumber (1995−1996) – Creative consultant

References

External links

Official website of MPCA Film

American film producers
Living people
Beverly Hills High School alumni
Stanford University alumni
Year of birth missing (living people)